is a former Japanese football player.

Playing career
Nakamura was born in Iwate Prefecture on June 26, 1977. After graduating from high school, he joined Japan Football League club Brummell Sendai (later Vegalta Sendai) in 1996. He played many matches as offensive midfielder and forward from first season. The club was promoted to J2 League from 1999. However he could not play many matches from 2000 and left the club end of 2001 season. After 2 years blank, he joined Regional Leagues club Grulla Morioka based in his local in 2004. He played for top team in 2 seasons.

Club statistics

References

External links

1977 births
Living people
Association football people from Iwate Prefecture
Japanese footballers
J2 League players
Japan Football League (1992–1998) players
Vegalta Sendai players
Iwate Grulla Morioka players
Association football midfielders